This is a list of the 19 members of the European Parliament for Austria in the 2019 to 2024 session.

These MEPs were elected at the 2019 European Parliament election in Austria.

List 
On the Austrian People's Party list: (EPP Group)

 Othmar Karas
 Karoline Edtstadler (replaced by Christian Sagartz in January 2020)
 Angelika Winzig
 Simone Schmiedtbauer
 Lukas Mandl
 Barbara Thaler
 Alexander Bernhuber

On the Social Democratic Party of Austria list: (S&D)

 Andreas Schieder
 Evelyn Regner
 Günther Sidl
 Bettina Vollath (replaced by Theresa Muigg in November 2022)
 Hannes Heide

On the Freedom Party list: (ID)

 Harald Vilimsky
 Georg Mayer
 Roman Haider

On The Greens – The Green Alternative list: (Greens-EFA)

 Sarah Wiener
 Monika Vana
 Thomas Waitz

On the NEOS – The New Austria list: (Renew)

 Claudia Gamon

References 

2019
Austria
List